Subramanian Bhupathy (also spelled as Subramaniam Bhupathy) (1963–2014) was an Indian herpetologist, wildlife biologist and researcher. He was a principal scientist at the Salim Ali Centre for Ornithology and Natural History (SACON). He headed a three-year study on the patterns of distribution of selected faunal groups on the Agasthyamalai hills. He worked on lizards, amphibians and birds and his contributions and works were more focused on reptiles. Dr Bhupathy was noted for work on pythons and python ecology in India and Indian turtles and tortoises.

He began his career in the mid-1980s when laboratories were not well-equipped. He held a Ph.D. in Zoology (Ornithology) from University of Rajasthan, Jaipur. At the age of 51, Bhupathy died after a fall while conducting herpetology field work near Agastya Mala hills on 28 April 2014.

Recognition 
 He was posthumously honored with the Turtle Conservation Appreciation Awards in 2015 by the Tortoise and Freshwater Turtle Specialist Group, International Union for Conservation of Nature (IUCN) and Species Survival Commission (SSC), for his contributions to the Conservation and Biology of Indian Chelonians.
 The species Nasikabatrachus bhupathi, a frog discovered in 2017 in the Western Ghats, and Uropeltis bhupathyi, a snake discovered in 2018 in Tamil Nadu, were named in his honor.

References

External links 
 Articles written by Bhupathy Subramanian at Current Science

1963 births
2014 deaths
Nature conservation in India
Indian herpetologists
Indian conservationists
20th-century Indian zoologists
University of Rajasthan alumni